Arthur A. Benjamin Health Professions High School (AABHPHS) is a small high school in the Upper Land Park neighborhood of Sacramento, California. A member of the Sacramento City Unified School District.

History 

During the fall of 2002 developers met with other founding partners to discuss the potential merits of a small healthcare high school for Sacramento. Sacramento was experiencing an extreme shortage of new, qualified healthcare workers and the Sacramento City Unified School District was in the process of developing a network of small, focused high schools.

Essentially an incredible design process was initiated. Since that time, the concept has been researched and refined to its present form. Much attention was placed on existing healthcare high school programs that work – in addition to data on students who are successful in collegiate programs. Today, AABHPHS is on the cutting edge of a new generation of small focused high schools – they look forward to sharing the collaborative design process and school model with other communities across the nation.

Designed as a small, safe and supportive high school, AABHPHS focuses on assisting students as they develop the educational and social foundation needed to ensure success in college, career, and citizenry. Students study in a safe, structured environment; blending solid academics, applied learning in local health systems and HOSA leadership activities.

In 2005, a temporary campus was built for inaugural freshmen for one year. And in late 2006, the final campus was completed.

AABHPHS is named after the late Senior Master Sergeant (Retired) Arthur A. Benjamin, U.S.A.F., a life support systems specialist and instructor in the United States Air Force; prior Director for the U.C. Davis Medical Center Cancer Ward; prior Air Force Junior ROTC instructor from nearby Hiram Johnson High School, and prior principal for Hiram Johnson.

Extracurricular and academic activities

The school offers many extracurricular and academic activities that include: HOSA, MESA, basketball, volleyball, science, Japanese, Latino, yearbook, leadership, anime, martial arts, and dance. The HOSA club and dance club of AABHPHS have gained state recognition. All clubs participate in school.

Awards 

Full WASC Accreditation (2006)
James Irvine Beta School (2006)
SCUSD Teacher of the Year (2006)
SCUSD Teacher of the Year (2007)

References

External links
 Sacramento City Unified School District
 SCUSD AABHPHS homepage
 SCUSD Detail
 Review on AABHPHS
 HOSA
 MESA

Educational institutions established in 2005
High schools in Sacramento, California
Public high schools in California
2005 establishments in California